Termitomyces reticulatus is a species of agaric fungus in the family Lyophyllaceae. Found in southern Africa, it was described as new to science in 1990. It is associated with the termite species Odontotermes badius and O. transvaalensis, which are widely distributed in South Africa.

References

Lyophyllaceae
Fungi described in 1990
Fungi of Africa